Sungai Ayer Tawar is a small town in Sabak Bernam District, Selangor, Malaysia. It is located near Bagan Nakhoda Omar.

Sabak Bernam District
Towns in Selangor